Craspedoxantha vernoniae is a species of tephritid or fruit flies in the genus Craspedoxantha of the family Tephritidae.

Distribution
Ethiopia, Kenya, Tanzania, Malawi, Zimbabwe.

References

Tephritinae
Insects described in 1985
Diptera of Africa